Darrin Dorsey (born May 17, 1987) is an American professional basketball player who last played for Trefl Sopot of the Polish Basketball League. He is a 1.88 m. tall point guard.

High school career
Dorsey played high school basketball at Glendale High School in Glendale, Arizona.

College career
After high school, Dorsey  played college basketball at Bakersfield, Dakota Wesleyan and Berea College from 2007 to 2011.

Professional career
On September 7, 2015, he signed in France at Poitiers which is playing in the second division in 2015–2016 for 32,000 euros in season. In the 11th game, the team won its third consecutive victory by winning against Le Portel ; Dorsey ends the match with 18 points in 7/10 shots including 2/4 at three points, 1 rebound and 4 assists in 29 minutes. The following weekend, Poitiers wins its fourth game in a row by beating Saint-Quentin; Dorsey had his best game with 30 points at 5/7 to 3-points shots, 6 rebounds and 2 assists for 30 devaluation in 36 minutes. He was named MVP of the January 2016 French Pro B championship with averages of 21 points, 4 rebounds and 4.5 assists over 34 minutes in the four league games of the month of January. His team beats Boulogne-sur-Mer and Dorsey was named MVP of the day finishing with 22 points to 7/8 to 5/8 shots including 3-pointers, 5 rebounds, 9 assists, 5 steals in 32 minutes. At the end of the season, the Poitiers club wanted to retain Dorsey but fails and replaces him with Steve McWhorter.

On August 5, 2016, he stays in France and signs at ESSM Le Portel, promoted to first division in 2016–2017. During a pre-season camp, he sprained his ankle. However, he managed to be reinstated for the first game of the season and the reception of Nanterre 92; his team lost 65–84 and Dorsey finished with 16 points (8 of 15 shots), 3 rebounds, 2 assists in 28 minutes. On October 22, 2017, he signed for the club Élan Chalon.

On July 24, 2018, he agreed to a deal with Greek team Holargos. He left the club during the season and joined U BT Cluj-Napoca of the Liga Națională.

On August 12, 2019, he has signed with Neptūnas Klaipėda of the Lithuanian Basketball League.

On November 24, 2021, he has signed with Trefl Sopot of the Polish Basketball League.

References 

1987 births
Living people
American expatriate basketball people in Argentina
American expatriate basketball people in Canada
American expatriate basketball people in Colombia
American expatriate basketball people in France
American expatriate basketball people in Greece
American expatriate basketball people in Israel
American expatriate basketball people in Mexico
American expatriate basketball people in Romania
American expatriate basketball people in Turkey
American men's basketball players
Bakersfield Renegades men's basketball players
Basketball players from Phoenix, Arizona
BC Neptūnas players
Berea College alumni
CS Universitatea Cluj-Napoca (men's basketball) players
Dakota Wesleyan Tigers men's basketball players
Élan Chalon players
ESSM Le Portel players
Halifax Rainmen players
Hapoel Kfar Saba B.C. players
Holargos B.C. players
Ostioneros de Guaymas (basketball) players
Point guards
Poitiers Basket 86 players
Unión de Santa Fe basketball players
Uşak Sportif players